The World Ten Times Over is a 1963 British drama film written and directed by Wolf Rilla and starring Sylvia Syms, June Ritchie, Edward Judd and William Hartnell.  Donald Sutherland makes a brief appearance in a night club scene, one of his earliest roles. The film was retitled Pussycat Alley in the US. The British Film Institute has described it as the first British film to deal with an implicitly lesbian relationship.

Plot
The lives of two club hostesses Billa and Ginnie, who work in the Soho area of London, have their friendship challenged by jealousies arising when Ginnie becomes romantically involved with Bob, a rich married businessman.

Cast
 Sylvia Syms ...  Billa (Sybilla)
 Edward Judd ...  Bob Shelbourne
 June Ritchie ...  Ginnie (Virginia)
 William Hartnell ...  Dad
 Sarah Lawson ...  Elizabeth
 Francis de Wolff ...  Shelbourne
 Davy Kaye ...  Compère
 Linda Marlowe ...  Penny
 Jack Gwillim ...  Bolton
 Kevin Brennan ...  Brian
 Alan White ...  Freddy

Production
The film marked the debut of Cyclops Productions, a company formed by Wolf Rilla and producer Michael Lucas. Finance was provided by Associated British. Filming started in January 1963 and took place on location in London and at Elstree Studios.

Critical reception
In a contemporary review Variety wrote, "The result is overdramatic but provides opportunities for deft thesping. Nightclub and location sequences in London have a brisk authenticity," the reviewer went on to praise Sylvia Syms' performance, "Her scenes with her father (William Hartnell) are excellent. Hartnell, playing the unworldly, scholarly father, who has no contact with his daughter, also gives an observant study. The other two principals are more phonily drawn characters. Edward Judd seems strangely uneasy in his role and Ritchie, despite many firstrate moments, sometimes appears as if she is simply jumping through paper hoops." TV Guide gave the film two out of four stars, concluding, "this is a somewhat stylized film, but the story is too depressing to make it work in the long run"; and the BFI praised Sym's "moving, melancholic performance."

Filmink said some viewers have "read this as a lesbian love story – maybe it is, but it’s definitely a female friendship story, very feminist for its time."

References

External links

1963 films
1963 drama films
Films shot at Associated British Studios
Films directed by Wolf Rilla
British drama films
British black-and-white films
Films set in London
1960s English-language films
1960s British films